Combat Pin for Civilian Service (CPCS) Is a combat service recognition decoration awarded to U.S. Army Corps of Engineers (USACE) civilian employees. The Gulf Region CPCS is a lapel pin designed after the Army Corps of Engineer's Gulf Region Division (GRD) logo.  The Afghanistan Region CPCS is modeled after the Afghanistan District (AED) logo.

Eligibility 
Must be a U.S. Army Corps of Engineer civilian employee that has served with the Gulf Region Division or Afghanistan Engineer District for more than 60 days within a combat zone.

References

External links 
  - for more information on the USACE Combat Pin for Civilian Service (CPCS)
 http://www.drum.army.mil/mountaineer/Article.aspx?ID=964
 https://web.archive.org/web/20130317175602/http://www.smdc.army.mil/SMDCPhoto_Gallery/Eagle/Archived/Aug05/Eagle_Aug.html
 http://frontier.cincinnati.com/blogs/iraq/2005_10_01_default.asp

Civil awards and decorations of the United States
Military awards and decorations of the United States